Ultimate Madness is a compilation album from the band Madness, consisting of 21 of their singles. It reached 27 in the UK charts and was an exclusive Tesco release.

Track listing
 "The Prince" - 2:29
 "One Step Beyond" - 2:20
 "My Girl" - 2:44
 "Night Boat to Cairo" - 3:30
 "Baggy Trousers" - 2:46
 "Embarrassment" - 3:10
 "The Return of the Los Palmas 7" - 2:33
 "Grey Day" - 3:39
 "Shut Up" - 2:51
 "It Must Be Love" - 3:17
 "Cardiac Arrest" - 2:56
 "House of Fun" - 2:48
 "Driving in My Car" - 3:17
 "Our House" - 3:22
 "Tomorrow's Just Another Day" - 3:10
 "Wings of a Dove" - 3:01
 "The Sun and the Rain" - 3:30
 "Michael Caine" - 3:38
 "NW5"
 "Dust Devil"
 "Forever Young"

Charts

Certifications and sales

References

External links

2010 compilation albums
Madness (band) compilation albums
Albums produced by Clive Langer
Albums produced by Alan Winstanley